The Ankara Nuclear Research and Training Center, known as ANAEM, is a nuclear research and training center of Turkey. The organization was established on August 18, 2010 as a subunit of Turkish Atomic Energy Administration (TAEK) in its campus at Ankara University's Faculty of Science situated in Beşevler neighborhood in central Ankara. The organization consists of three divisions, which are engaged in education, training  and public relations on nuclear matters.

See also
 ÇNAEM Çekmece Nuclear Research and Training Center in Istanbul
 SANAEM Sarayköy Nuclear Research and Training Center in Ankara

References

Nuclear research institutes
Research institutes in Turkey
Nuclear technology in Turkey
Science and technology in Turkey
Buildings and structures in Ankara
Organizations based in Ankara
Organizations established in 2010
Ankara University
Yenimahalle, Ankara
2010 establishments in Turkey